Chichester Guildhall is a building in Chichester, West Sussex, England. The name is a bit of a misnomer, as the building was constructed as a chancel by the Grey Friars of Chichester, an Order of Franciscans. The Grey Friars received the land, now called Priory Park, in a grant from Richard, Earl of Cornwall, in 1269. It is a scheduled monument.

The first record of The Guildhall in Priory Park talks of an ordination held by Archbishop John Peckham, in 1283. This date ties in with the architectural features of the Guildhall. The building is a magnificent example of late 13th-century architecture and is one of the few Franciscan Friaries in England that is still roofed.

The western wall was a later addition, leading to the belief that some portion on the nave must have at least been begun. This modification to the building was executed so as to allow the chancel arch to remain visible spanning the whole width of the structure. Symmetrical windows separated by buttresses line the northern and southern sides of the building. The windows have simple chamfers on the outside with no further mouldings.

See also
 Guild
 Guildhall

References

Buildings and structures in Chichester
Grade I listed buildings in West Sussex
13th-century church buildings in England
Scheduled monuments in West Sussex
Tourist attractions in Chichester